Jakob Anders Eklund (born 21 February 1962) is a Swedish film, television and stage actor. He portrayed the fictional police officer Johan Falk in 20 movies.

His wife, Marie Richardson, played his on-screen girlfriend in the trilogy of films The Third Wave, Executive Protection and Zero Tolerance, as well as in the other 17 films about Johan Falk, released between 2009 and 2015.

Selected filmography 
 2008 - Les Grandes Personnes
 2003 - Daybreak
 2003 - The Third Wave
 2001 - Executive Protection
 1999 - Zero Tolerance
 1994 - House of Angels – The Second Summer
 1993 - The Ferris Wheel
 1992 - House of Angels

Television
August (2007)
Tusenbröder (2003, 2003, 2006)
  Wallander The Joker (2005)

References

External links

1962 births
Living people
Swedish male film actors
Swedish male television actors
20th-century Swedish male actors
21st-century Swedish male actors
Actors from Gothenburg